Jack Monohan Jr. (9 September 1902 – 1 February 1987) was an Australian rules footballer who played two seasons for Collingwood in the Victorian Football League.

Playing career

Collingwood
Monohan, son of the Collingwood half-back Jack Monohan, played seven games over the 1924 and 1925 VFL seasons.

Preston
By the late 1920s Monohan had crossed to Preston in the Victorian Football Association.

References

1902 births
Collingwood Football Club players
Preston Football Club (VFA) players
Australian rules footballers from Melbourne
1987 deaths
People from Collingwood, Victoria